Rudolph Tesing (February 4, 1881 – April 29, 1926) was an American wrestler who competed in the 1904 Summer Olympics. In 1904, he won a silver medal in lightweight category.

References

External links
profile

1881 births
1926 deaths
Wrestlers at the 1904 Summer Olympics
American male sport wrestlers
Olympic silver medalists for the United States in wrestling
Medalists at the 1904 Summer Olympics